Alberta Provincial Highway No. 25, commonly referred to as Highway 25, is a highway in southern Alberta, Canada, north of Lethbridge.

Highway 25 begins at an interchange with Highway 3 on the northwestern outskirts of Lethbridge.  University Drive extends south into West Lethbridge as a major thoroughfare, but is not designated as Highway 25.

It proceeds north passing by the hamlets of Diamond City and Shaughnessy until it comes to Highway 519 where it turns east and then goes north just after the Town of Picture Butte. It continues north until it reaches Highway 843 where it turns east again. It passes by the Hamlet of Iron Springs; crosses Highway 845; and reaches the Hamlet of Turin.

Just north of Turin, Highway 521 branches off to the east as Highway 25 moves north and ends when it meets Highway 526 west of the Hamlet of Enchant.

Major intersections 
From south to north:

References 

025
Transport in Lethbridge